Main page: List of Canadian plants by family

Families:
A | B | C | D | E | F | G | H | I J K | L | M | N | O | P Q | R | S | T | U V W | X Y Z

Iridaceae 

 Iris brevicaulis — Lamance iris
 Iris lacustris — dwarf lake iris
 Iris missouriensis — western blue iris
 Iris prismatica — slender blueflag
 Iris setosa — beach-head iris
 Iris virginica — Virginia blueflag
 Iris x robusta
 Iris x sancti-cyrii — St. Cyr's iris
 Olsynium douglasii — Douglas' blue-eyed-grass
 Sisyrinchium albidum — white blue-eyed-grass
 Sisyrinchium angustifolium — pointed blue-eyed-grass
 Sisyrinchium atlanticum — eastern blue-eyed-grass
 Sisyrinchium bellum — California blue-eyed-grass
 Sisyrinchium californicum — golden blue-eyed-grass
 Sisyrinchium campestre — prairie blue-eyed-grass
 Sisyrinchium fuscatum — coastal plain blue-eyed-grass
 Sisyrinchium idahoense — Idaho blue-eyed-grass
 Sisyrinchium littorale — Alaska blue-eyed-grass
 Sisyrinchium montanum — strict blue-eyed-grass
 Sisyrinchium mucronatum — Michaux's blue-eyed-grass
 Sisyrinchium septentrionale — northern blue-eyed-grass

Isoetaceae 

 Isoetes acadiensis — Acadian quillwort
 Isoetes bolanderi — Bolander's quillwort
 Isoetes echinospora — spinyspore quillwort
 Isoetes engelmannii — Appalachian quillwort
 Isoetes howellii — Howell's quillwort
 Isoetes lacustris — western lake quillwort
 Isoetes macrospora — lake quillwort
 Isoetes maritima — maritime quillwort
 Isoetes nuttallii — Nuttall's quillwort
 Isoetes occidentalis — western quillwort
 Isoetes prototypus — spike quillwort
 Isoetes riparia — riverbank quillwort
 Isoetes tuckermanii — Tuckerman's quillwort
 Isoetes x dodgei — Dodge's quillwort
 Isoetes x eatonii — Eaton's quillwort
 Isoetes x harveyi — Harvey's quillwort
 Isoetes x heterospora
 Isoetes x hickeyi — Hickey's quillwort
 Isoetes x truncata — truncate quillwort

Jubulaceae 

 Frullania bolanderi
 Frullania brittoniae
 Frullania eboracensis
 Frullania inflata
 Frullania oakesiana
 Frullania selwyniana
 Frullania tamarisci

Juglandaceae 

 Carya alba — mockernut hickory
 Carya cordiformis — bitternut hickory
 Carya glabra — sweet pignut hickory
 Carya laciniosa — big shellbark hickory
 Carya ovalis — red hickory
 Carya ovata — shagbark hickory
 Carya x laneyi — Laney's hickory
 Juglans cinerea — butternut
 Juglans nigra — black walnut

Juncaceae 

 Juncus acuminatus — sharpfruit rush
 Juncus acutiflorus — sharpflower rush
 Juncus albescens — northern white rush
 Juncus alpinoarticulatus — northern green rush
 Juncus ambiguus — seaside rush
 Juncus arcticus — arctic rush
 Juncus articulatus — jointed rush
 Juncus balticus — Baltic rush
 Juncus biflorus — grass-leaved rush
 Juncus biglumis — two-flower rush
 Juncus bolanderi — Bolander's rush
 Juncus brachycarpus — shortfruit rush
 Juncus brachycephalus — smallhead rush
 Juncus brevicaudatus — narrowpanicle rush
 Juncus breweri — Brewer's rush
 Juncus bufonius — toad rush
 Juncus bulbosus — bulbous rush
 Juncus caesariensis — New Jersey rush
 Juncus canadensis — Canada rush
 Juncus castaneus — chestnut rush
 Juncus confusus — Colorado rush
 Juncus covillei — Coville's rush
 Juncus drummondii — Drummond's rush
 Juncus dudleyi — Dudley's rush
 Juncus effusus — soft rush
 Juncus ensifolius — three-stamened rush
 Juncus falcatus — sickleleaf rush
 Juncus filiformis — thread rush
 Juncus gerardii — black-grass rush
 Juncus greenei — Greene's rush
 Juncus haenkei — Thaddäus Haenke's rush
 Juncus interior — inland rush
 Juncus kelloggii — Kellogg's rush
 Juncus lesueurii — salt rush
 Juncus longistylis — long-styled rush
 Juncus marginatus — grassleaf rush
 Juncus mertensianus — Mertens' rush
 Juncus militaris — bayonet rush
 Juncus nevadensis — Sierran rush
 Juncus nodosus — knotted rush
 Juncus occidentalis — western rush
 Juncus oxymeris — pointed rush
 Juncus parryi — Parry's rush
 Juncus pelocarpus — brownfruit rush
 Juncus regelii — Regel's rush
 Juncus saximontanus — Rocky Mountain rush
 Juncus secundus — secund rush
 Juncus stygius — Moor rush
 Juncus subcaudatus — woodland rush
 Juncus subtilis — creeping rush
 Juncus supiniformis — hairyleaf rush
 Juncus tenuis — slender rush
 Juncus torreyi — Torrey's rush
 Juncus tracyi — Tracy's rush
 Juncus trifidus — highland rush
 Juncus triglumis — three-flower rush
 Juncus vaseyi — Vasey's rush
 Juncus x alpiniformis
 Juncus x fulvescens
 Juncus x gracilescens
 Juncus x lemieuxii — Lemieux's rush
 Juncus x nodosiformis
 Luzula acuminata — hairy woodrush
 Luzula alpinopilosa — alpine woodrush
 Luzula nivalis — arctic woodrush
 Luzula arcuata — curved woodrush
 Luzula campestris — common woodrush
 Luzula comosa — Pacific woodrush
 Luzula confusa — northern woodrush
 Luzula echinata — hedgehog woodrush
 Luzula glabrata — smooth woodrush
 Luzula groenlandica — Greenland woodrush
 Luzula multiflora — common woodrush
 Luzula parviflora — smallflower woodrush
 Luzula piperi — Piper's woodrush
 Luzula rufescens — hairy woodrush
 Luzula spicata — spiked woodrush
 Luzula wahlenbergii — Wahlenberg's woodrush

Juncaginaceae 

 Lilaea scilloides — flowering quillwort
 Triglochin concinna — slender arrow-grass
 Triglochin gaspensis — Gaspé Peninsula arrow-grass
 Triglochin maritima — common bog arrow-grass
 Triglochin palustris — slender bog arrow-grass

Jungermanniaceae 

 Anastrophyllum assimile
 Anastrophyllum helleranum
 Anastrophyllum michauxii
 Anastrophyllum minutum
 Anastrophyllum saxicola
 Anastrophyllum tenue
 Barbilophozia atlantica
 Barbilophozia attenuata
 Barbilophozia barbata
 Barbilophozia binsteadii
 Barbilophozia cavifolia
 Barbilophozia floerkei
 Barbilophozia hatcheri
 Barbilophozia kunzeana
 Barbilophozia lycopodioides
 Barbilophozia quadriloba
 Chandonanthus setiformis
 Cryptocolea imbricata
 Gymnocolea acutiloba
 Gymnocolea inflata
 Jamesoniella autumnalis
 Jungermannia atrovirens
 Jungermannia confertissima
 Jungermannia crenuliformis
 Jungermannia exsertifolia
 Jungermannia gracillima
 Jungermannia hyalina
 Jungermannia karl-muelleri
 Jungermannia leiantha
 Jungermannia obovata
 Jungermannia polaris
 Jungermannia pumila
 Jungermannia rubra
 Jungermannia sphaerocarpa
 Jungermannia subelliptica
 Lophozia alpestris
 Lophozia ascendens
 Lophozia badensis
 Lophozia bantriensis
 Lophozia bicrenata
 Lophozia capitata
 Lophozia collaris
 Lophozia excisa
 Lophozia gillmanii
 Lophozia grandiretis
 Lophozia groenlandica
 Lophozia guttulata
 Lophozia heterocolpos
 Lophozia hyperarctica
 Lophozia incisa
 Lophozia latifolia
 Lophozia laxa
 Lophozia longidens
 Lophozia obtusa
 Lophozia opacifolia
 Lophozia pellucida
 Lophozia rutheana
 Lophozia sudetica
 Lophozia ventricosa
 Lophozia wenzelii
 Mylia anomala
 Mylia taylorii
 Nardia breidleri
 Nardia geoscyphus
 Nardia insecta
 Nardia scalaris — ladder flapwort
 Tritomaria exsecta
 Tritomaria exsectiformis
 Tritomaria heterophylla
 Tritomaria polita
 Tritomaria quinquedentata
 Tritomaria scitula

Canada,family,I